The 1883 Harvard Crimson football team represented Harvard University in the 1883 college football season. The team compiled an 8–2 record, losing its rivalry games against both Princeton and Yale. Randolph M. Appleton was the team captain.

Schedule

References

Harvard
Harvard Crimson football seasons
Harvard Crimson football